The Jocko River (Salish: nisisutetkʷ ntx̣ʷe ) is a roughly  tributary of the Flathead River in western Montana in the United States. It rises in the foothills of the Rocky Mountains and flows west into the Flathead at Dixon. The elevation is  where it joins the Flathead. It is also known as Jacques Fork, Jim's Fork, Prune River or Wild Horse Creek. The river breaks into three forks, the North, Middle and South Forks, of which the Middle Fork is considered the main stem.

It is named after Jacques (Jocko) Raphael Finlay (1768-1828), an early Metis fur trader, scout, and explorer. It is located on the Flathead Indian Reservation and forms the south border of the Bison Range.

The Jocko Valley was the site of flooding in June 2011, when the Jocko River overflowed its banks as a result of a "200% of average" snowpack combined with heavy precipitation.

See also

List of rivers of Montana
Montana Stream Access Law
Columbia River

Notes

Rivers of Lake County, Montana
Rivers of Sanders County, Montana
Rivers of Montana